was a Japanese actor active from the 1920s to the 1960s.

Career
Egawa was born in Kanagawa Prefecture to a Japanese mother and a German father. His name "Ureo" is a Japanification of his German name "Willy". He joined the Taikatsu film studio in 1920, but not finding stable work, he joined a gang of delinquents. Egawa of this period became the model for Ton Satomi's novel . Putting his life back together, he debuted as a director in 1927, but eventually joined the Shochiku studio as an actor, where he starred in films by directors such as Yasujirō Ozu and Yasujirō Shimazu. He later worked at Nikkatsu, Toho and Shintoho, before appearing on television in the 1960s, most famously in Ultra Q. In his later years, he did charity work to help other mixed-race children.

Selected filmography

Film

Kyôdainaka wa (1921)
Fumetsu Shinran - Jidai-hen; Gendai-hen (1929) - Ichirô
Ômoîde oki onna (1931)
Seikatsu-sen ABC (1931)
Nanatsu no umi: Zenpen - Shojo-hen (1931) - Yuzuru
Depâto no himegimi (1932)
Konjiki yasha (1932) - Fujita Taro
Nanatsu no umi: Kôhen - Teisô-hen (1932) - Yuzuru
Sanjûni-nen-gata ren'ai bushidô (1932)
Manshû kôshinkyoku (1932)
Aa, Kuga shôsa (1932)
Mushibameru haru (1932) - Seichirô Komori
Satsueijo romansu, renai annai (1932)
Byakuya wa akaruku (1932) - Shôichirô Amagasaki
Seishun no yume ima izuko (1932) - Tetsuo Horino
Bôfûtai (1932)
Joriku dai-ippo (1932)
Hanayome no negoto (1933) - Enatsu
Woman of Tokyo (東京の女, Tokyo no onna) (1933) - Ryoichi
Ôendanchô no koi (1933) - Miyajima
Shima no musume (1933)
Kimi to wakarete (1933) - Guest
Seidon (1933) - Minoru Katagiri
Japanese Girls at the Harbor (港の日本娘, Minato no Nihon musume) (1933) - Henry
Koi no shôhaî (1933)
Sasurai no otome (1933)
Ureshii koro (1933) - Yasuo Tsuda
Rappa to musume (1933)
Kekkon kaido (1933)
Hatsukoi no haru (1933)
Gaika no kage ni (1934)
Sakura ondo (1934)
Chijô no seiza - Zempen: Chijô-hen (1934)
Chijô no seiza - Kôhen: Seiza-hen (1934)
Tajô bûsshîn (1934)
Seppun jûjiro (1935)
Nozokareta hanayome (1935)
Jazz no machikado (1935)
Olympic yokochô (1937)
Etchan (1937) - Rokutaro Yanagi
Kagirinaki zenshin (限りなき前進) (1937)
Jidai no kiri - Harumi no maki (1937)
Dai-kongô no fu (1938)
Tokyo yôsai (1938)
Apâto kôkyôkyoku (1938)
Robo no ishi (1938)
Seifuku no machi - Zempen (1939)
Seifuku no machi - Kôhen (1939)
Kesa to Morito (1939)
Sonno sonjuku (1939)
Nessa no chikai (Zenpen; Kôhen) (1940) - Ichiro Sugiyama
Kinô kieta otoko (1941) - Rokunoshin Hara, yoriki
Anî no hânayomê (1941) - Kenichi Kanou
Gubijinsô (1941) - Hajime Munechika
Yukiko to natsuyo (1941)
Wagaya ha tanoshi (1941)
The Sky of Hope (1942) - Vunoshin Narishima
Midori no daichi (1942) - Kozoo Izawa
Matte ita otoko (1942)
Yottsu no kekkon (1944) - Chutaro Okuma
Minshū no Teki (1946)
Kyô wa odote (1947)
Kyûjukyû niume no hanayome (1947)
Mitari kiitari tameshitari (1947)
Kakedashi jidai (1947) - Brother-In-law Kohei
Ano yume kono uta (1948) - Principal
Kuro-uma no danshichi (1948)
Fujisancho (1948)
Haha (1948)
Ikiteiru gazô (1948)
Shirozukin arawaru (1949) - Jun'an Yasuda
Haru no tawamure (1949)
Goodbye (1949) - Kenzo Sekine
Nabeshima kaibyou den (1949)
Kage o Shitaite (1949)
Tsuma to onna kisha: Wakai ai no kiki (1950) - Editor in chief
Kimi to yuku America kôro (1950)
Banana musume (1950)
Amakara chindôchû (1950)
Wakasama samurai torimonochô: nazo no nômen yashiki (1950) - Masaki Hiromitsu
Uchôten jidai (1951)
Tsuki yori no haha (1951)
Inu-himesama (1952)
Rikon (離婚) (1952) - Shôgo Yamamura
Tokyo no ekubo (1952)
Yatarô gasa: zenkôhen'(1952) - TamazôWaga koi no lila no kokage ni (1953)Kenkyô edo-murasaki (1954)Kimimachi-bune (1954) - GondôHatsuwarai kaneigozen jiai (1954)Tasogare sakaba (1955) - YamaguchiAkagi no chi matsuri (1955)Hokkai no hanran (1956) - Captain AbeChakkari fujin to Ukkari fujin: Fûfu goenman no maki (1956) - PresidentMorishige no Shinkonryoko (1956)Kengo tai goketsu: Homare no kessen (1956)Daigaku no kengo keiraku no abarenbo (1956)Onryo sakura dai-sodo (1956) - Chief BodyguardKaii Utsunomiya tsuritenjô (1956) - Kawamura UtsuboOnna keirin-ô (1956) - MitaraiKenji to sono imôto (1956)Gunshin Yamamoto gensui to Rengô kantai (1956)Nichibei Hanayome Hanamuko Irekae Torikae Gassen (1957) - Mr. McKinleyMeiji tennô to nichiro daisenso (1957)Escapade in Japan (1957) - Chief of Kyoto Police (uncredited)Yojaso no maou (1957) - Professor SakuradaSen'un Ajia no Joō (戦雲アジアの女王) (1957)Tenka no oni yashahime (1957)Star Dokusatsu Jiken (1958)Equinox Flower (1958) - Schoolmate NakanishiTennô, kôgô to nisshin sensô (1958)Kyōen Kobanzame (侠艶小判鮫, Kyōen Kobanzame) (1958)Daitoa senso to kokusai saiban (1959) - Lawyer ShimazuTeisô no Arashi (1959) - Eizô MurofushiKagebôshi torimonochô (1959)Tsubanari sankengô (1959)Boku wa dokushin shain (1960) - President of Dômei Oil CompanyNi-nirokushiken Daisshutsu (1962)Nippon ichi no horafuki otoko (1964) - President Saijô

TelevisionUltra Q'' (1966-1967) - Dr. Ichinotani (final appearance)

References

External links

1902 births
1970 deaths
Male actors from Kanagawa Prefecture
Japanese film directors
Japanese people of German descent
Japanese male silent film actors
20th-century Japanese male actors